Franklin County is a county located in the U.S. state of Washington. As of the 2020 census, its population was 96,749. The county seat and largest city is Pasco. The county was formed out of Whitman County on November 28, 1883, and is named for Benjamin Franklin.

Franklin County is included in the Tri-Cities metropolitan area. Together, Kennewick, Richland and Pasco comprise Washington's Tri-Cities.

Geography

Geographic features
Columbia River
Hanford Nuclear Reservation
Juniper Dunes Wilderness
Snake River

Major highways
 SR 260
 Interstate 182
 U.S. 12
 U.S. 395

Adjacent counties
Adams County - north
Whitman County - east
Walla Walla County - southeast
Columbia County - southeast
Benton County - southwest
Grant County - northwest

National protected areas
 Hanford Reach National Monument (part)
 Saddle Mountain National Wildlife Refuge (part)

Demographics

Franklin County, along with Adams County, have the highest per capita percentage of Latino residents in the state.

2010 census
As of the 2010 census, there were 78,163 people, 23,245 households, and 18,163 families residing in the county. The racial makeup of the county was 60.5% white, 1.9% black or African American, 1.8% Asian, 0.7% American Indian, 0.1% Pacific islander, 31.8% from other races, and 3.2% from two or more races. Those of Hispanic or Latino origin made up 51.2% of the population. In terms of ancestry, 13.1% were German, 6.8% were English, 6.5% were Irish, and 3.3% were American.

Of the 23,245 households, 49.9% had children under the age of 18 living with them, 57.9% were married couples living together, 13.4% had a female householder with no husband present, 21.9% were non-families, and 16.4% of all households were made up of individuals. The average household size was 3.28 and the average family size was 3.68. The median age was 28.4 years.

The median income for a household in the county was $47,749 and the median income for a family was $52,218. Males had a median income of $40,604 versus $29,517 for females. The per capita income for the county was $18,660. About 16.5% of families and 19.9% of the population were below the poverty line, including 25.6% of those under age 18 and 13.7% of those age 65 or over.

The 2019 county population is estimated to be 95,222, a 21.8% increase since 2010. This far outpaces Washington State's overall growth of 13.2% over the same time interval, and puts Franklin County among the fastest-growing counties in the nation.

In 2018 the county contained 28,647 housing units.

Communities

Cities
Connell
Kahlotus
Mesa
Pasco (county seat)

Census-designated places
Basin City
West Pasco

Unincorporated communities
Eltopia
Harder

Government
Franklin County has a Board of County Commissioners which is the governmental authority of the county. The board consists of three commissioners; they are elected by the voters and serve four-year terms. Other elected county officials include Assessor, Auditor, Clerk, Coroner, Prosecuting Attorney, Sheriff, and Treasurer.

Politics

Franklin is a strongly Republican county in Presidential elections. No Democratic presidential candidate has carried Franklin County since Lyndon B. Johnson’s 1964 landslide, and the last Democratic gubernatorial candidate it backed was Dixy Lee Ray in 1976.

See also
National Register of Historic Places listings in Franklin County, Washington

Notes

References

Further reading

Available online through the Washington State Library's Classics in Washington History collection

External links
Franklin County, Washington at HistoryLink.org
Tri-City Regional Chamber of Commerce

 
1883 establishments in Washington Territory
Populated places established in 1883
Tri-Cities, Washington
Eastern Washington